Regimental Sgt. Zippo is the thirty-first studio album by English musician Elton John. Originally recorded in 1967 and 1968, it remained unreleased until Record Store Day of June 2021, when the mono version was issued on vinyl. In early July 2022, the album saw a broader release in stereo vinyl and stereo/mono CD.

Background
Regimental Sgt. Zippo was recorded between November 1967 and May 1968. For the sessions, John worked with musicians who were either his or his manager Steve Brown's associates, including guitarist Caleb Quaye and drummer Roger Pope (both members of the band Hookfoot at the time), and bassist Tony Murray (from the Troggs). The project was eventually shelved in favour of what would become John's debut album, Empty Sky (1969). 

According to John's collaborator Bernie Taupin, the album's trippy sound was "a tip of the hat to Sgt. Pepper. It certainly proved that we were hanging on the coattails of things that were currently popular – things like 'A Whiter Shade of Pale' were in vogue at that particular point in time. I think, in a way, I was literally trying to be part of a gang." 

Plastic Penny—which featured drummer Nigel Olsson, who would become a full-fledged member of John's band in the 1970s—covered "Turn to Me" in 1969.

Release
Regimental Sgt. Zippo was eventually released, 53 years after its inception, on 12 June 2021 for Record Store Day, as a mono vinyl-only release limited to 7,000 copies. It was released on compact disc on 8 July 2022, featuring both mono and stereo mixes of the complete album, along with a stereo vinyl version.

Track listing 
All songs are written by Elton John and Bernie Taupin, except where noted.

Side one
"When I Was Tealby Abbey" – 2:35
"And the Clock Goes Round" – 3:06
"Sitting Doing Nothing" (John, Caleb Quaye) – 2:30
"Turn to Me" – 3:16
"Angel Tree" – 2:04
"Regimental Sgt. Zippo" – 4:44

Side two
"A Dandelion Dies in the Wind" – 3:14
"You'll Be Sorry to See Me Go" (John, Quaye) – 2:34
"Nina" – 3:50
"Tartan Coloured Lady" – 4:09
"Hourglass" – 2:44
"Watching the Planes Go By" – 4:07

Personnel 
Credits adapted from Elton John's website and album liner notes.

Musicians
Elton John (as Reg Dwight) – piano, electric piano, organ, harpsichord, lead and backing vocals
Caleb Quaye – acoustic and electric guitars, flute, percussion, backing vocals
Dee Murray – bass, backing vocals
Dave Hynes – drums, backing vocals
Paul Fenoulhet Orchestra

Technical
Caleb Quaye – producer
Dave Larkham – original Elton John illustration
Darren Evans – sleeve design
Frank Owen – engineer
John Barrett – mixing
Sean Magee – mastering
Zack Laurence – orchestral arranger

Charts

References

External links

2021 albums
Elton John albums
Psychedelic rock albums by English artists
Mercury Records albums